Marcinowo may refer to the following places in Poland:
Marcinowo, Lower Silesian Voivodeship (south-west Poland)
Marcinowo, Ełk County in Warmian-Masurian Voivodeship (north Poland)
Marcinowo, Gołdap County in Warmian-Masurian Voivodeship (north Poland)